Katie Leigh Zelem (born 20 January 1996) is an English professional footballer who plays as a midfielder for Women's Super League club Manchester United, which she also captains, and the England women's national team.

Zelem has previously played for Liverpool and Italian side Juventus, and has represented England from under-15 to senior levels.

Club career

Early career
Zelem started playing football when she was six. At the age of eight, she joined Manchester United Girls' Centre of Excellence. Her youth coach Emma Fletcher said Zelem showed a great attitude and appetite for learning and understanding the game.

Liverpool
With no professional set up at United, Zelem joined Liverpool in 2013. She was in the Liverpool squad for the first time on 3 August 2013 when Liverpool lost 3–0 to Arsenal, however, she did not play.

On 11 April 2014, Zelem suffered a broken collarbone, while on international duty for England under-19, and missed the start of the 2014 FA WSL season. After recovering from injury, she made her senior team debut on 29 June 2014, before being substituted for Nina Frausing-Pedersen in the 58th minute, in a 1–0 defeat against Arsenal in the FA WSL. A week later, Zelem scored her first senior goals in a 7–1 win against Durham in the Continental Cup. She scored two headers, both assisted by Lucy Bronze.

On 12 October 2014, Zelem was an unused substitute in Liverpool's win against Bristol City, as they retained the FA WSL title after a dramatic final day of the season. In November 2014, Zelem was nominated by The FA for the WSL Development Player of the Year, alongside Carla Humphrey and Natasha Baptiste. In the same month, Zelem was named Liverpool's Young Player of the Year. Liverpool coach Matt Beard praised Zelem, likening her to Frank Lampard and stating she has great career in the future. In December, Zelem signed a new contract.

In November 2015, Zelem penned a new contract with Liverpool.

Juventus
In August 2017, she moved to Juventus for an undisclosed fee. On 9 September, Zelem scored her first goal, on her competitive debut, for Juventus in an 8–0 win over Torino in the Coppa Italia. Zelem played a total of four games, scoring two goals in the competition as Juventus lost 1–0 to Brescia in the quarter final on 2 May 2018.

On 30 September 2017, Zelem made her first Serie A appearance as a substitute in the club's inaugural match, a 3–0 win at Atalanta. Three weeks later, Zelem scored her first league goal in a 4–1 win against Empoli. On 20 May 2018, Juventus won the Serie A title in their first ever season in existence after defeating Brescia in a penalty shoot-out in the Championship playoff. Zelem left at the end of the campaign.

Manchester United
 
In July 2018, Zelem joined Manchester United for their inaugural season in the FA Women's Championship for the 2018–19 season, one of seven players to return to the senior side having played for the club at youth level. She made her competitive debut for Manchester United in a 1–0 League Cup victory against former club Liverpool on 19 August. In the opening game of the 2018–19 Championship season, she scored her first goal for United, on her league debut, from the penalty spot in a 12–0 win away to Aston Villa. Zelem was voted FA Women's Championship Player of the Month for March 2019. At the end of the season, Zelem was named Manchester United Women's Player of the Year. In doing so, she became the first player to win the award.

Following the departure of Alex Greenwood in August 2019, Zelem was named as club captain ahead of the 2019–20 season. Zelem scored her first goal of the season, a penalty, in Manchester United's 2–0 WSL win against Liverpool on 28 September. In a 1–1 draw against Reading on 2 February 2020, a penalty was awarded against Zelem after she was penalised for a handball, despite the ball hitting her head, leading to criticism of the standard of refereeing.

Across two consecutive games in 2022, Zelem scored three Olympico goals directly from corner kicks, one during a 1–4 exit to Manchester City in the FA Cup and two in a 4–0 WSL victory over Leicester City.

International career

Youth
Zelem made her youth debut for England for the under-15s when she played against Netherlands in March 2010. In August 2013, Zelem was part of the England under-19 team who finished as runners-up to France at the UEFA Women's Under-19 Championship in Wales.

In February 2014, Zelem was named in the England under-19 squad for the 2014 La Manga Tournament in March. In August, she represented England under-20 at the 2014 FIFA U-20 Women's World Cup in Canada. Coached by Mo Marley, Zelem was used as the playmaker of England's midfield. After draws with South Korea and Mexico, England failed to progress to the knock-out stage after being defeated by eventual finalists Nigeria 2–1 in the final group game. In July 2015, Zelem was named in the England under-19 squad for the UEFA Women's Under-19 Championship in Israel. England finished bottom of group B and did not progress.

Senior
In September 2020, Zelem received her first senior national team call-up by Phil Neville as part of a 30-player training camp at St George's Park. She was later forced to withdraw, having to isolate after testing positive for COVID-19. Having been an unused substitute in three previous 2023 World Cup qualifying matches under new manager Sarina Wiegman, Zelem made her England debut on 30 November 2021 as a 71st-minute substitute during an England-record 20–0 win against Latvia. Zelem was named as part of England's 28-player preliminary squad for UEFA Women's Euro 2022, but did not make the final squad.

Style of play
Speaking in 2014, Martha Harris, Zelem's best friend and Liverpool teammate, rated Zelem as "a very cheeky player [who is] clever on the pitch but is also a risk taker" She is described as an attacking midfielder with two good feet, who can pick a pass out and finish as well.

Personal life
Born in Manchester, Zelem is the daughter of former Macclesfield goalkeeper Alan Zelem, whose twin brother is former professional footballer Peter Zelem. She was educated at The Blue Coat School, Oldham.

Zelem greatly admired Fara Williams, who became her role model in developing the game as a midfielder. Zelem considered herself fortunate that she can learn and play along a hard-working figure like Williams.

Career statistics

Club
.

International
Statistics accurate as of match played 19 February 2023.

Honours
Liverpool
 FA Women's Super League: 2013, 2014

Juventus
 Serie A: 2017–18

Manchester United
 FA Women's Championship: 2018–19

England
Arnold Clark Cup: 2022, 2023
Individual
 Liverpool Ladies Young Player of the Year: 2014
 FA Women's Championship Player of the Month: March 2019

 FA Women's Super League Goal of the Month: March 2022

 Manchester United Women's Player of the Year: 2018–19

References

External links
 Profile at the Manchester United F.C. website
 Profile at the Football Association website
 
 
 
 
 

1996 births
Living people
English women's footballers
Liverpool F.C. Women players
Women's Super League players
Footballers from Oldham
Women's association football midfielders
Serie A (women's football) players
Juventus F.C. (women) players
Manchester United W.F.C. players
English expatriate women's footballers
Expatriate women's footballers in Italy
English expatriate sportspeople in Italy
England women's international footballers